Guacanagarix (alternate transcriptions: Guacanacaríc, Guacanagarí) was one of five Taíno caciques of the Caribbean island henceforth known as Hispaniola at the arrival of the Europeans in 1492. This was contemporaneous with the first of the voyages of Christopher Columbus.

He was the chief of the cacicazgo of Marién, which occupied the northwest of the island.

Guacanagarix received Christopher Columbus after the Santa María was wrecked during his first voyage to the New World. He allowed Columbus to establish the settlement of La Navidad near his village. The colonists that remained there were killed by a rival tribe before Columbus returned on his second voyage.

Guacanagarix refused to ally himself with other caciques, who were trying to expel the Spaniards from the Captaincy General of Santo Domingo, and many times served as an informant and spy for the European settlers.

Guacanagarix complex
In the Dominican Republic, the term "Guacanagarix complex" has been used to describe a Dominican who is considered more interested in foreign culture than in his own country.

See also
Taíno peoples
Spanish–Taíno War of San Juan–Borikén
Colony of Santo Domingo topics
Spanish West Indies
Chiefdoms of Hispaniola

References

See: "El primer virreinato americano" by Roberto Cassá, Raimundo González de Peña, Genaro Rodríguez Morel. Anuario de Estudios Americanos, 63, 2,julio-diciembre, 13-26, Sevilla (España), 2006.
 * Excerpt from Typical wedding decoration in Guacanagarix

Taíno leaders
15th-century rulers in North America
Haitian people of Taíno descent
Indigenous Caribbean people
History of the Colony of Santo Domingo